The 1929 Marquette Golden Avalanche football team was an American football team that represented Marquette University as an independent during the 1929 college football season. In its eighth season under head coach Frank Murray, the team compiled a 4–3–1 record and outscored all opponents by a total of 118 to 53. The team played its home games at Marquette Stadium in Milwaukee.

Frank Murray was Marquette's head football coach for 19 years and was posthumously inducted into the College Football Hall of Fame in 1983.

Schedule

References

Marquette
Marquette Golden Avalanche football seasons
Marquette Golden Avalanche football